Famegana is a monotypic butterfly genus in the family Lycaenidae erected by John Nevill Eliot in 1973. Its single species, Famegana alsulus, the black-spotted grass blue, was first described by Gottlieb August Wilhelm Herrich-Schäffer in 1869. It is found in the Australasian realm.

Subspecies
F. a. alsulus Torres Strait Island, North Australia - New South Wales
F. a. lulu (Mathew, 1889) Fiji
F. a. kalawarus (Ribbe, 1926) Sulawesi
F. a. eggletoni (Corbet, 1941) Hong Kong

References

Polyommatini
Lycaenidae genera